Vivendi is a multinational French-based media conglomerate, formerly Compagnie Générale des Eaux.

Vivendi may also refer to:

 Veolia Environnement (previously Vivendi Environnement), former water and waste division of Vivendi
 Vivendi Entertainment, film, television and DVD distribution company
 Vivendi Games, former subsidiary of Vivendi S.A. and holdings company for Sierra Entertainment and Blizzard Entertainment

See also
 Modus vivendi, legal term